Speed is a 1922 American action film serial directed by George B. Seitz. The story is a typically convoluted serial plot. Speed Stansbury is heir to a large fortune. A master criminal hires someone to frame Speed for murder and bank robbery. As Speed pursues the man who can prove his innocence to South America, he himself is followed by Lucy, the woman he loves.

Cast
 Charles Hutchison as Speed Stansbury
 Lucy Fox as Lucy Durant
 John Webb Dillion as Edwin Stansbury
 Harry Semels as Jim Sprague
 Cecile Bonnel as Vera Harper
 Winifred Verina as Mrs. Sprague
 Joe Cuny as Hagerty
 Tom Goodwin as J.J. Stansbury
 Charles 'Patch' Revada as Pious Pedro
 R. Henry Grey

Chapter titles
1. The Getaway 2.Nerve 3.Pious Pedro 4. The Quagmire 5.Fighting Mad 6.Panic 7.Jaws of Danger 8.Caught 9.Hit or Miss 10.Buried Alive 11.Into the Crusher 12.Trimmed 13.Risky Business 14. The Peril Rider 15.Found Guilty

See also
 List of film serials
 List of film serials by studio

References

Notes
Rainey, Buck, Serials and Series, a World Filmography, 1912-1956, 1999, McFarland & Co., Inc.
Lahue, Kalton C., Continued Next Week, A History of the Moving Picture Serial, 1964, University of Oklahoma Press

External links

1922 films
American silent serial films
1920s action films
American black-and-white films
Films directed by George B. Seitz
American action films
1920s American films
Silent action films